The Peugeot Type 66 was the first large car from French automaker Peugeot, as well as the first vehicle from that manufacturer to have four cylinders. Most were made as closed-top limousines. Production ran throughout 1904 and a total of 20 were built.

References
Peugeot company history of Type 66
Histomobile on Type 66
Peugeot Car Models 1889-1909

Type 66
Cars introduced in 1904
Veteran vehicles